Michael B. Elowitz is a biologist and professor of Biology, Bioengineering, and Applied Physics at the California Institute of Technology, and investigator at the Howard Hughes Medical Institute. In 2007 he was the recipient of the Genius grant, better known as the MacArthur Fellows Program for the design of a synthetic gene regulatory network, the Repressilator, which helped initiate the field of synthetic biology. In addition, he showed, for the first time, how inherently random effects, or 'noise', in gene expression could be detected and quantified in living cells, leading to a growing recognition of the many roles that noise plays in living cells. His work in Synthetic Biology and Noise represent two foundations of the field of Systems Biology.

Career
His laboratory studies the dynamics of genetic circuits in individual living cells using synthetic biology, time-lapse microscopy, and mathematical modeling, with a particular focus on the way in which cells make use of noise to implement behaviors that would be difficult or impossible without it. 
Recently, his lab has expanded their approaches beyond bacteria to include eukaryotic and mammalian cells.

Life 
Elowitz grew up in Los Angeles, California, where he attended the humanities magnet at Alexander Hamilton High School (Los Angeles). 
He studied Physics and graduated with a B.A. from the University of California, Berkeley in 1992, and from Princeton University with a Ph.D. in 1999.  
In 1997–1998, he spent one year at the European Molecular Biology Laboratory at Heidelberg.
Afterwards, he was a postdoctoral fellow at the Rockefeller University in New York City.

While working as a graduate student at Princeton he co-authored songs such as Sunday at the Lab with Uri Alon.

Awards
 2022 Elected to the National Academy of Sciences
 2019 Raymond and Beverly Sackler International Prize in Biophysics
 2015 Elected to the American Academy of Arts and Sciences
 2011 HFSP Nakasone Award
 2008 Presidential Early Career Award in Science and Engineering
 2008 Discover Magazine "Top 20 under 40"
 2007 MacArthur Fellows Program
 2006 Packard Fellow
 2004 Technology Review TR100 List of Top Innovators
 2003 Burroughs Welcome Fund Interfaces award

Peer-reviewed publications
Li P, Markson JS, Wang S, Chen S, Vachharajan V, Elowitz MB, "Morphogen gradient reconstitution reveals Hedgehog pathway design principles," Science (2018). 
Bintu L, Yong J, Antebi YE, McCue K, Kazuki Y, Uno N, Oshimura M, Elowitz MB, "Dynamics of epigenetic regulation at the single-cell level," Science (2016). 
Lin Y, Sohn CH, Dalal CK, Cai L, Elowitz MB,  Combinatorial gene regulation by modulation of relative pulse timing, Nature, 2015

References

External links
"Hacking DNA", IEEE Spectrum, Paul McFedries, October 2009
"Michael B Elowitz", Scientific Commons
"Michael Elowitz", Science blog

21st-century American biologists
MacArthur Fellows
California Institute of Technology faculty
Howard Hughes Medical Investigators
Living people
Year of birth missing (living people)
University of California, Berkeley alumni
Princeton University alumni
Synthetic biologists
Systems biologists
Fellows of the American Academy of Arts and Sciences
Recipients of the Presidential Early Career Award for Scientists and Engineers